The Chicago Blackhawks are a professional ice hockey team based in Chicago, Illinois. They are members of the Central Division of the Western Conference in the National Hockey League (NHL). The club was founded in 1926 as one of the League's first American franchises and are today part of the NHL's "Original Six" teams—a term reserved for the six teams that comprised the NHL from the 1942–43 season until the league expanded in 1967.

The Blackhawks have won numerous team and individual awards and honors. They have won the Stanley Cup as the league champions in 1934, 1938, 1961, 2010, 2013, and 2015. The Presidents' Trophy was awarded to the club in the 1990–91 and 2012–13 seasons for finishing with the most points.

League awards

Team trophies
The Chicago Blackhawks have won the Clarence S. Campbell Bowl as Western (previously the Campbell) Conference champions four times. They won the league championship Stanley Cup six times. They have also won the Presidents' Trophy twice as the top team in the NHL during the regular season.

Individual awards

All-Stars

NHL first and second team All-Stars
The NHL first and second team All-Stars are the top players at each position as voted on by the Professional Hockey Writers' Association.

NHL All-Rookie Team
The NHL All-Rookie Team consists of the top rookies at each position as voted on by the Professional Hockey Writers' Association.

All-Star Game selections
The National Hockey League All-Star Game is a mid-season exhibition game held annually between many of the top players of each season. Sixty-four All-Star Games have been held since 1947, with at least one player chosen to represent the Blackhawks in each year except 2004. The All-Star game has not been held in various years: 1979 and 1987 due to the 1979 Challenge Cup and Rendez-vous '87 series between the NHL and the Soviet national team, respectively, 1995, 2005, and 2013 as a result of labor stoppages, 2006, 2010, and 2014 because of the Winter Olympic Games, and 2021 as a result of the COVID-19 pandemic. Chicago has hosted four of the games. The 2nd, 15th, 27th, and 42nd games all took place at Chicago Stadium.

 Selected by fan vote
 Selected by Commissioner
 All-Star Game Most Valuable Player

All-Star benefit games
Prior to the institution of the National Hockey League All-Star Game the league held three different benefit games featuring teams of all-stars.  The first was the Ace Bailey Benefit Game, held in 1934, after a violent collision with Eddie Shore of the Boston Bruins left Ace Bailey of the Toronto Maple Leafs hospitalized and unable to continue his playing career.  In 1937 the Howie Morenz Memorial Game was held to raise money for the family of Howie Morenz of the Montreal Canadiens who died from complications after being admitted to the hospital for a broken leg.  The Babe Siebert Memorial Game was held in 1939 to raise funds for the family of the Canadiens' Babe Siebert who drowned shortly after he retired from playing.

All-Star Game replacement events

Career achievements

Hockey Hall of Fame
The following is a list of Chicago Blackhawks who have been enshrined in the Hockey Hall of Fame.

Foster Hewitt Memorial Award
Two members of the Blackhawks organization have been honored with the Foster Hewitt Memorial Award. The award is presented by the Hockey Hall of Fame to members of the radio and television industry who make outstanding contributions to their profession and the game of ice hockey during their broadcasting career.

Lester Patrick Trophy
Eleven members of the Blackhawks organization have been honored with the Lester Patrick Trophy. The trophy has been presented by the National Hockey League and USA Hockey since 1966 to honor a recipient's contribution to ice hockey in the United States. This list includes all personnel who have ever been employed by the Chicago Blackhawks in any capacity and have also received the Lester Patrick Trophy.

United States Hockey Hall of Fame

Retired numbers

The Chicago Blackhawks have retired seven numbers. The first jersey retired was #21 in honor of Stan Mikita, who played center for the club from 1958 to 1980. Three years later, the Hawks retired Bobby Hull's #9. Goaltenders Glenn Hall (#1) and Tony Esposito (#35) had their numbers retired on the same night in 1988. The number of Denis Savard was raised to the rafters in 1998. The most recent number retired was #81, for Marián Hossa. Also out of circulation is the number 99 which was retired league-wide for Wayne Gretzky on February 6, 2000. Gretzky did not play for the Blackhawks during his 20-year NHL career and no Blackhawks player had ever worn the number 99 prior to its retirement.

Other awards

See also
List of National Hockey League awards

Notes

References

Chi
award
Awards